Vienna Standard Mean Ocean Water (VSMOW) is an isotopic standard for water. Despite the name, VSMOW is pure water with no salt or other chemicals found in the oceans. The VSMOW standard was promulgated by the International Atomic Energy Agency (based in Vienna) in 1968, and since 1993 continues to be evaluated and studied by the IAEA along with the European Institute for Reference Materials and Measurements and the American National Institute of Standards and Technology. The standard includes both the established values of stable isotopes found in waters and calibration materials provided for standardization and interlaboratory comparisons of instruments used to measure these values in experimental materials.

The designation ocean water refers to water molecules collected directly from the ocean, rather than from other points in the water cycle (e.g., rain, snow, river or lake water). Water from different points in the water cycle contains molecules with differing ratios of isotopes due to the slight differences the isotopes cause in the rates of evaporation and condensation. VSMOW is not a standard for seawater, which contains other molecules in addition to water molecules. Fresh distilled VSMOW is used to make high accuracy measurements of water's physical properties and to produce laboratory standards.

Before VSMOW was defined, average ocean water and melted snow were used as references.  These conventions were refined in the 1960s by the standardized definition of Standard Mean Ocean Water (SMOW). The U.S. National Bureau of Standards (now the National Institute of Standards and Technology, NIST) created physical water standards for global use. However, the physical integrity of the U.S. standards came into question. The use of the SMOW standard was discontinued.

VSMOW is a recalibration of the original SMOW definition and was created in 1967 by Harmon Craig and other researchers from Scripps Institution of Oceanography at the University of California, San Diego who mixed distilled ocean waters collected from different spots around the globe. VSMOW remains one of the major isotopic water benchmarks in use today, used for both hydrogen and oxygen isotopes.

Composition
The isotopic composition of VSMOW water is specified as ratios of the molar abundance of the rare isotope in question divided by that of its most common isotope and is expressed as parts per million (ppm). For instance 16O (the most common isotope of oxygen with eight protons and eight neutrons) is roughly 2632 times more prevalent in sea water than is 17O (with an additional neutron). The isotopic ratios of VSMOW water are defined as follows:

2H/1H = 155.76 ± 0.1 ppm (a ratio of 1 part per approximately 6420 parts)
3H/1H = 1.85 ±0.36 × 10−11 ppm (a ratio of 1 part per approximately 5.41 × 1016 parts, ignored for physical properties-related work)
18O/16O = 2005.20 ± 0.43 ppm (a ratio of 1 part per approximately 498.7 parts)
17O/16O = 379.9 ± 1.6 ppm (a ratio of 1 part per approximately 2632 parts)

Although each water molecule contains two hydrogen atoms and one oxygen atom, VSMOW composition is given in terms of the atoms and is indifferent to the isotopic combinations in molecules.

Use in temperature standards  
The International Committee for Weights and Measures specified in 2005 that the definition of the kelvin temperature scale would refer to water with a composition of the nominal specification of VSMOW.  The decision was welcomed in 2007 by Resolution 10 of the 23rd CGPM. This effectively defined the triple point of VSMOW to be exactly 273.16 K and 0.01 °C.

As of the 2019 redefinition of the SI base units, the kelvin is defined in terms of the Boltzmann constant, which makes the definition completely independent of the properties of water. The triple point now has a measured value, not a defined value. The defined value for the Boltzmann constant was selected so that the measured value of the triple point is identical to the prior defined value to within the limits of accuracy of contemporary metrology.

Very pure, carefully distilled VSMOW remains important in the manufacture of high-accuracy temperature measurement reference standards. Due to differences in isotopic composition, water samples from various sources may exhibit slight differences in physical properties, including triple point, density, boiling point, and vapor pressure. Snow, river water, and rainwater, all of which are recently evaporated ocean water, tend to be depleted in the heavier isotopes of hydrogen and oxygen, which affects the triple point. Temperature reference cells filled with water of improper isotopic composition can cause errors of several hundred microkelvin in the measured triple point.

See also
Properties of water

References

External links
International Atomic Energy Agency - IAEA
ITS-90 - Swedish National Testing and Research Institute
ITS-90 - Omega Engineering
Scripps Institution of Oceanography
Temperature Sensors - information repository
Scientific data of water - London South Bank University

Vsmow
Vsmow
Vsmow
Standards